Kurt Dopfer is an Austrian-born Swiss economist, since 1980 Professor at the Department of Economics of University of St. Gallen, Switzerland, chair of international economics and development theory, Co-director of Institute of Economics, member University Senate, Emeritus, researcher of Swiss National Science Foundation. He also served as a visiting professor of economics at the International Christian University, Tokyo, Technical University of Dresden, Economics University of Vienna, University of Queensland, Brisbane, Institute for Advanced Studies, Vienna, and as a Commission Member of the Austrian Academy of Sciences.

Kurt Dopfer published several books and numerous articles in twelve languages, has been a member of the editorial board of several journals, such as the Journal of Evolutionary Economics, and served as a board member of various scientific associations, e.g., the International Joseph A. Schumpeter Society, European Association for Evolutionary Political Economy and the Ausschuss für Evolutorische Ökonomik of the German Economic Association.

Kurt Dopfer is best known for several contributions in evolutionary economics, such as the axiomatization of evolutionary economic approach (Dopfer, 2001, 2005). In his recent publication, Dopfer (2004) argues that a concept of homo oeconomicus has to be replaced by the concept of rule-based agent, homo sapiens oeconomicus.

Kurt Dopfer with co-authors (Dopfer, Foster, Potts, 2004) has also espoused the introduction of meso economics mesoeconomics, which deals with an intermediate level of analysis in economics, apart from the micro- (individual) and macro- (aggregate) level. The meso-level is where collective behavioural patterns originate, are diffused and retained as technological or institutional regimes. Meso works as an intermediary linking micro-level interactions and macro-level dynamics.

See also
 Mesoeconomics

Publications

 Kurt Dopfer 'Evolutionary Economics: Framework for analysis', in: K. Dopfer, ed. 2001. Evolutionary Economics: Program and Scope, Recent Economic Thought Series, Boston/Dordrecht/London: Kluwer Academic Publishers,  pp. 1–44. 
 Kurt Dopfer, John Foster, & Jason Potts, 2004. 'Micro-meso-macro,' Journal of Evolutionary Economics, Springer, vol. 14(3), pp. 263–279. (abstract)
 Kurt Dopfer, 2004. 'The economic agent as rule maker and rule user: Homo Sapiens Oeconomicus,' Journal of Evolutionary Economics, Springer, vol. 14(2), pp. 177–195.
 Kurt Dopfer, 2012. ‘The Origins of Meso Economics. Schumpeter’s Legacy and Beyond´, Journal of Evolutionary Economics, Springer, vol. (22), pp. 133–160.
 Kurt Dopfer, Jason Potts (2008) The General Theory of Economic Evolution. London: Routledge. 
 Kurt Dopfer, 2005/2006. ’Evolutionary Economics: A Theoretical Framework’. In: The Evolutionary Foundations of Economics, ed. K. Dopfer. Cambridge: Cambridge University Press.
 Kurt Dopfer, Jason Potts (eds.) 2014. Evolutionary Microeconomics; Evolutionary Mesoeconomics; Evolutionary Macroeconomics (three vols.). Elgar Critical Library, Cheltenham: Edward Elgar. ‘Evolutionary Economics: A Theoretical Framework’. In: The Evolutionary Foundations of Economics, ed. K. Dopfer. Cambridge: Cambridge University Press.

External links
 Kurt Dopfer's homepage

Swiss economists
Living people
Members of the European Academy of Sciences and Arts
Year of birth missing (living people)